The Black Rock Desert Wilderness is a U S Wilderness Area in Nevada under the Bureau of Land Management. It is located in the east arm of the Black Rock Desert playa east of the Black Rock Range and west of the Jackson Mountains.

The wilderness has a land area of 314,829 acres, or 1,274.1 km². It is the largest U.S. designated wilderness area that is managed solely by the Bureau of Land Management, and the largest that is not located within a National Forest, National Park (or Preserve), or National Wildlife Refuge. It is located within the Black Rock Desert – High Rock Canyon Emigrant Trails National Conservation Area, also managed by the BLM.

See also 
Black Rock Desert-High Rock Canyon Emigrant Trails National Conservation Area
List of largest wilderness areas in the United States

References

External links 
Black Rock Desert Wilderness page at Wilderness.net

Black Rock Desert
Protected areas of the Great Basin
Wilderness areas of Nevada
Protected areas of Humboldt County, Nevada
IUCN Category Ib
Protected areas of Pershing County, Nevada
Bureau of Land Management areas in Nevada